Alan George Peters OBE (17 January 1933 – 11 October 2009) was a British furniture designer maker and one of the very few direct links with the Arts and Crafts Movement, having apprenticed to Edward Barnsley. He set up his own workshop in the Sixties. He is well known for his book Cabinetmaking - a professional approach (re-published in 2009) and his revision (for the fourth edition) of Ernest Joyce's The Technique of Furniture Making.

In 1990 he was awarded the OBE for his services to furniture and in 1998 he moved to Minehead in West Somerset. He was a main exponent of the seventies British Craft Revival. His work is rooted in tradition and shows a deep understanding and respect for his material wood. In 2009 fellow furniture designer maker Jeremy Broun made a film and wrote a book called "Alan Peters - The Makers' Maker". To a generation of British woodworkers in the seventies and eighties he is considered to be the greatest British furniture designer maker. He died on 11 October 2009 aged 76.

He is known for his particularly elegant furniture work, such as an adzed, fan-like table and a tabletop with a bowl carved into it. Although his work was influenced by Japanese woodworking, he rejected Japanese tools after experimenting with them. He is famed among other woodworkers and furniture makers for his use of the No. 7 plane - a particularly large and heavy one - for nearly everything.
Since 2010 The Alan Peters Award for Excellence has been run as an annual award, established by Jason Heap, a designer maker and director of The Celebration of Craftsmanship and Design exhibitions. The award open to furniture makers under 30 years of age was set up to continue the important legacy of Alan Peters.

References

External links
 Alan Peters - Daily Telegraph obituary

British furniture designers
Officers of the Order of the British Empire
1933 births
2009 deaths